Randy Meisner is the self-titled debut solo studio album by Randy Meisner. It was released in mid 1978, on Asylum in the United States, and in the United Kingdom. The track "Bad Man", was featured in the film FM, which also included an appearance by his one-time employer Linda Ronstadt.

Critical reception
Retrospectively reviewing for AllMusic, critic Bruce Eder wrote of the album "The songs run between the extremes of fluid, guitar-driven rockers ("Bad Man," "Every Other Day") and ballads draped in flowing lyricism with harmony singing ("Daughter of the Sky"), including major contributions from his one-time teenage bandmate Donny Ullstrom. Apart from a somewhat dullish rendition of "Save the Last Dance for Me," the album works well, particularly a soulful and highly personalized rendition of "Take It to the Limit.""

Track listing
"Bad Man" (Glenn Frey, J.D. Souther) - 2:39
"Daughter of the Sky" (Bill Lamb) - 4:15
"It Hurts to Be in Love" (Howard Greenfield, Helen Miller) - 2:27
"Save the Last Dance for Me" (Doc Pomus, Mort Shuman) - 2:58
"Please Be With Me" (Scott Boyer) - 3:22
"Take It to the Limit" (Meisner, Frey, Don Henley) - 4:19
"Lonesome Cowgirl" (Alan Brackett, John Merrill) - 3:43
"Too Many Lovers" (Lamb) - 4:04
"If You Wanna Be Happy" (Frank Guida, Joseph Royster, Carmela Guida) - 2:45
"I Really Want You Here Tonight" (Brackett) - 3:49
"Every Other Day" (Lamb) - 3:52
"Heartsong" (Bill Martin) - 3:59

Charts

Personnel
 Randy Meisner - bass, guitar, vocals, background vocals
 Byron Berline - fiddle, violin
 Alan Brackett - vocals, background vocals, Marxophone
 David Cassidy - vocals, background vocals
 Steve Edwards - dobro, guitar, steel guitar, slide guitar
 Victor Feldman - percussion
 John Hobbs - organ, piano, electric piano
 Tita Kerpan - vocals, background vocals
 Bill Lamb - vocals, background vocals
 Geoffrey Leib - piano
 Kerry Morris - bass
 Marty Paich - strings
 Steven Scharf - background vocals
 Kelly Shanahan - drums
 Scott Shelley - synthesizer, synthesizer strings
 J.D. Souther - vocals, background vocals
 Jerry Swallow - guitar
 Donny Ullstrom - vocals, background vocals
 Ritchie Walker - vocals, background vocals
 Ernie Watts - saxophone
 Jayne Zinsmaster - backing vocals

References

Randy Meisner albums
1978 debut albums
Asylum Records albums